Jubayr or Jubair  is an Arabic masculine given name, which means "mender", "unbreaker".

People named Jubayr include:
Jubair ibn Mut'im

People using it in their patronymic include:
Sa'id ibn Jubayr
Ibn Jubayr

People using it in their family names include:
Talha Jubair

See also 
Arabic name

Arabic masculine given names